Charles Matthews (March 11, 1863 – December 26, 1926) was an American Major League Baseball player who played in one Major League game for the  Philadelphia Athletics of the American Association.

Biography
In his only game, Matthews was the starting right fielder for the Athletics on September 25, 1891, in a home game against the Washington Statesmen. In five plate appearances he went 1-for-3 (a single), was hit by pitches twice, and scored one run, helping his team to a 13-4 victory. Elton "Icebox" Chamberlain was the starter and winner for Philadelphia.

References

External links

19th-century baseball players
Major League Baseball right fielders
Baseball players from Camden, New Jersey
Philadelphia Athletics (AA 1891) players
1863 births
1926 deaths
Peoria Distillers players
Easton Dutchmen players
Philadelphia Colts players
Pottsville Colts players